Christian Zeitz (born 18 November 1980 in Heidelberg) is a former German handball player.

Zeitz received a silver medal at the 2004 Summer Olympics in Athens with the German national team. He is World Champion from 2007, and European champion from 2004.

References

External links
 
 
 

1980 births
Living people
Sportspeople from Heidelberg
German male handball players
German expatriate sportspeople in Hungary
Olympic handball players of Germany
Olympic silver medalists for Germany
Olympic medalists in handball
Handball players at the 2004 Summer Olympics
Handball players at the 2008 Summer Olympics
Medalists at the 2004 Summer Olympics